Monmouthshire County RFC is a Welsh rugby union club that manages an invitational team, known as Monmouthshire that originally played rugby at county level. The team was made up of amateur players from sports clubs in the Monmouthshire region and historically played matches against other county teams from Wales and England, and during the 20th century was a fixture for touring international teams. Today clubs from the Monmouthshire region are still affiliated to Monmouthshire County RFC, as well as the Welsh Rugby Union.

Games played against international opposition

Welsh rugby union teams
History of Monmouthshire